Yesterday  is an EP released by Grave Digger. It also contains a bonus DVD. The song "Yesterday" on this EP is a re-recorded version of the song from Grave Digger's debut album.

Track listing
 "Yesterday"
 "The Reaper's Dance"
 "No Quarter" (Led Zeppelin cover)
 "Yesterday (Orchestral Version)"

Live at the Rock Machina festival, 2001, DVD
 "Intro
 "Scotland United"
 "The Dark of the Sun"
 "The Reaper"
 "The Round Table"
 "Excalibur"
 "Circle of Witches"
 "Symphony of Death"
 "Lionheart"
 "Morgane Lefay"
 "Knights of the Cross"
 "Rebellion"
 "Heavy Metal Breakdown"

Personnel
Chris Boltendahl - Vocals
Manni Schmidt - guitars
Jens Becker - bass
Stefan Arnold - drums
H.P. Katzenburg - keyboards

2006 EPs
Grave Digger (band) EPs
Locomotive Music EPs